The George Washington Bridge is a double-decked suspension bridge spanning the Hudson River, connecting Fort Lee in Bergen County, New Jersey, with Upper Manhattan in New York City. It is named after George Washington, the first president of the United States. The George Washington Bridge is the world's busiest motor vehicle bridge, carrying a traffic volume of over 104million vehicles , and is the world's only suspension bridge with 14 vehicular lanes . It is owned by the Port Authority of New York and New Jersey, a bi-state government agency that operates infrastructure in the Port of New York and New Jersey. The George Washington Bridge is also informally known as the GW Bridge, the GWB, the GW, or the George, and was known as the Fort Lee Bridge or Hudson River Bridge during construction. It was the longest main bridge span in the world from its 1931 opening until the Golden Gate Bridge in San Francisco opened in 1937.

The George Washington Bridge is an important travel corridor within the New York metropolitan area. It has an upper level that carries four lanes in each direction and a lower level with three lanes in each direction, for a total of 14 lanes of travel. The bridge's upper level also carries pedestrian and bicycle traffic. Interstate 95 (I-95) and U.S. Route 1/9 (US 1/9, composed of US 1 and US 9) cross the river via the bridge. U.S. Route 46 (US 46), which lies entirely within New Jersey, terminates halfway across the bridge at the state border with New York. At its eastern terminus in New York City, the bridge continues onto the Trans-Manhattan Expressway (part of I-95, connecting to the Cross Bronx Expressway).

The idea of a bridge across the Hudson River was first proposed in 1906, but it was not until 1925 that the state legislatures of New York and New Jersey voted to allow for the planning and construction of such a bridge. Construction on the George Washington Bridge started in September 1927; the bridge was ceremonially dedicated on October 24, 1931, and opened to traffic the next day. The opening of the George Washington Bridge contributed to the development of Bergen County, New Jersey, in which Fort Lee is located. The upper deck was widened from six to eight lanes in 1946. The six-lane lower deck was constructed beneath the existing span from 1959 to 1962 because of increasing traffic flow.

Description 

The George Washington Bridge was designed by chief civil engineer Othmar Ammann, design engineer Allston Dana, and assistant chief engineer Edward W. Stearns, with Cass Gilbert as consulting architect. It connects Fort Lee in Bergen County, New Jersey, with Washington Heights in Manhattan, New York.

Decks 

The bridge carries 14 lanes of traffic, seven in each direction. As such, the George Washington Bridge contains more vehicular lanes than any other suspension bridge, and is the world's busiest vehicular bridge. The fourteen lanes of the bridge are split unevenly across two levels: the upper level contains eight lanes while the lower level contains six lanes. The upper level originally had six lanes, though two more lanes were added in 1946. Although the lower level was part of the original plans for the bridge, it did not open until August 29, 1962. Vehicles carrying hazardous materials (HAZMATs) are prohibited on the lower level due to its enclosed nature. HAZMAT-carrying vehicles may use the upper level, provided that they conform to strict guidelines as outlined in the Port Authority's "Red Book".

There are two sidewalks on the upper span of the bridge, one on each side. However, cyclists and pedestrians can usually only utilize the southern sidewalk, since the northern sidewalk is normally closed. The northern sidewalk was temporarily reopened in 2017 while a temporary suicide prevention fence was installed on the southern sidewalk, in preparation for the installation of permanent fences on both sidewalks.

It held this title until the opening of the Golden Gate Bridge in 1937. The completion of the George Washington Bridge proved that longer suspension bridges were both physically and economically feasible. Prior to the bridge's construction, engineers had believed that a suspension span's length was a large indicator of a suspension bridge's economic feasibility.

During the planning process, Ammann designed the deck around the "deflection theory", an as-yet-unconfirmed assumption that longer suspension decks did not need to be as stiff in proportion to its length, because the weight of the longer deck itself would provide a counterweight against the deck's movement. This had been tested by Leon Moisseiff when he designed the Manhattan Bridge in 1909, though it was less than half the length of the George Washington Bridge. Stiffening trusses were ultimately excluded from the George Washington Bridge's design to save money; instead, a system of plate girders was installed on the underside of the upper deck. This provided the stiffening that was necessary for the bridge deck, and it was replicated on the lower deck during its construction. The plate-girders underneath each deck, combined with an open-truss design on the bridge's side that connected the decks with each other, resulted in an even stiffer span that was able to resist torsional forces.

Cables 

Four -diameter main cables support the bridge deck. Each main cable contained 61 strands, with each strand made of 434 individual wires, for a total of 26,474 wires per main cable, and 105,986 in all. The cables are covered by a sheath of weather-resistant steel. The upper bridge deck is held by vertical suspender wires attached directly to the main cables by saddle connections; the lower deck is supported by girders attached to the upper.

The main cables are anchored in concrete on both sides of the bridge, in a purpose-built anchorage on the New York side and bored and set directly into the cliffs of the Palisades on the New Jersey. Originally, the end of each was cable was supposed to receive one of several ornamental designs, such as a wing, fin, tire, or statue; cost-savings after the start of the Great Depression in 1929 preempted the flourishes.

Suspension towers 

Each bridge has two archways, one above and one below the decks.

The original design called for the towers to be encased in concrete and granite in a Revival style, similar to the Brooklyn Bridge. Additional scrutiny of the proposed bridge's engineering found that the steel alone could support the towers, with only a decorative stone facade being retained in the plan. Elevators to carry sightseers to restaurants and observatory proposed decks at the top of each tower were also all pared from the design. Ultimately, even stone facades were postponed in 1929 during the Great Depression due to rising material costs. Even though the steel towers had been left that way for cost reasons, some aesthetic critiques of the bare steel towers were favorable. Several groups, such as the American Institute of Steel Construction, believed that covering the steel framework with masonry would be both misleading and "fundamentally ugly".

While the exposed steel towers' design was negatively received by a few critics such as Raymond Hood and William A. Boring, the public reception at the bridge's opening was generally positive. The Swiss-French architect Le Corbusier wrote of the towers: "The structure is so pure, so resolute, so regular that here, finally, steel architecture seems to laugh." Milton MacKaye wrote in The New Yorker that the George Washington Bridge had established Ammann as "one of the immortals of bridge engineering and design, a genius." Ammann never incorporated masonry towers in his bridge plans again. He wrote that the "sturdy appearance and well-balanced distribution of steel in the columns and bracing" gave the bridge's towers "a good appearance, a neat appearance".  Over time, the exposed steel towers, with their distinctive criss-crossed bracing, became one of the George Washington Bridge's most identifiable characteristics.

American flag 

Since 1947 or 1948, the bridge has flown the world's largest free-flying American flag on special occasions. Until 1976, the flag was taken out of a garage in New Jersey and manually erected on national holidays. During the United States' bicentennial, a mechanical hoisting system was installed, and the flag was stored along the bridge's girders when not in use. When weather allows, it is hoisted on Martin Luther King Jr. Day, Presidents Day, Memorial Day, Flag Day, Independence Day, Labor Day, Columbus Day, and Veterans Day. Since 2006, the flag is also flown on September 11 of each year, honoring those lost in the September 11 attacks. On events where the flag is flown, the tower lights are lit from dusk until 11:59 p.m.

History 
The bridge sits near the sites of Fort Washington (in New York) and Fort Lee (in New Jersey), which were fortified positions used by General George Washington and his American forces as they attempted to deter the occupation of New York City in 1776 during the American Revolutionary War. Unsuccessful, Washington evacuated Manhattan by ferrying his army between the two forts.

By the end of the 19th century there were more than 200 separate municipalities along the lower Hudson River and the New York Bay, with no unified agency to control commerce or transport in the area  and no fixed crossing.  The first was proposed in 1888 by civil engineer Gustav Lindenthal, who later became New York City's bridge commissioner. The Hudson and Manhattan Railroad and the Pennsylvania Railroad opened three pairs of tubes under the lower Hudson in the 1900s. The first vehicular crossing across the lower Hudson River, the Holland Tunnel, was opened in 1927, connecting Lower Manhattan with Jersey City.

Planning

A vehicular bridge across the Hudson River was being considered as early as 1906, during the planning for the Holland Tunnel. Three possible locations for a suspension bridge were considered in the vicinity of 57th, 110th, and 179th Streets in Manhattan, with others rejected on the grounds of aesthetics, geography, or traffic flows. In 1920, English architect Alfred C. Bossom proposed a double-decker bridge with room for vehicular and railroad traffic near 57th Street in Midtown Manhattan. The same year, Othmar Ammann and Gustav Lindenthal proposed a vehicular and railroad bridge to 57th Street in Manhattan, topped by an office building on the Manhattan end that would have been the world's tallest. Lindenthal's plan failed because it did not receive permits from the United States Army Corps of Engineers or approval from the city, and because Midtown Manhattan real estate developers and planners opposed the plan. Ammann unsuccessfully attempted to convince Lindenthal to build his bridge elsewhere, without a tower atop the bridge's terminus. In January 1924, the New York State Chamber of Commerce voted against the 57th Street location in favor of another upstream. Despite this, Lindenthal proposed that a bridge be built there, and carry 16 railroad tracks and 12 lanes of automotive traffic.

Meanwhile, Ammann became chief engineer of the Port of New York Authority (now the Port Authority of New York and New Jersey), which was created in 1921 to oversee commerce and transport along the lower Hudson River and New York Bay. He had disassociated himself from Lindenthal's proposal by 1923, conducting his own studies on the feasibility of a bridge from 178th Street in Fort Washington, Manhattan, to Fort Lee in New Jersey. Ammann's advocacy for the Fort Washington–Fort Lee bridge gained support from both New Jersey governor George Silzer and New York governor Alfred E. Smith by mid-1923.  In May 1924, Colonel Frederick Stuart Greene, the New York Superintendent of Public Works, announced a plan to construct a suspension bridge between Fort Lee and Fort Washington. At that location, both sides were surrounded by steep cliffs (The Palisades on the New Jersey side, and Washington Heights on the New York side). Thus, it was possible to build the bridge without either impeding maritime traffic or requiring lengthy approach ramps from ground level.

A New Jersey state assemblyman introduced a bill for the Hudson River bridge that December. This bill was passed in the New Jersey Assembly in February 1925. After an initial rejection by Silzer, the Assembly made modifications before passing the bill again in March, after which Silzer signed the bill. Around the same time, the New York state legislature was also considering a similar bill. A dispute developed between New York civic groups, who supported the construction of the Hudson River Bridge; and the Parks Conservation Association, who believed that the bridge towers would degrade the quality of Fort Washington Park directly underneath the proposed bridge's deck. In late March 1925, the chairman of the Parks Conservation Association noted that the proposed New York state legislation would provide for the actual construction of the bridge, rather than just the planning. Ultimately, the Hudson River bridge bill was passed in the New York state legislature, and Smith approved the bill that April.

In March 1925, Silzer asked Ammann to devise preliminary plans for the Hudson River bridge. Ammann found that the width of the Hudson River decreased by more than  when it passed between Fort Lee and Fort Washington. However, the differing heights meant that a large cut had to be made through the Fort Lee ledge so that the bridge approach could be built there. The same month, the New Jersey legislature asked for funds for test bores to determine if the geological strata would support the bridge. In response to continuing concerns from park preservationists, Ammann stated that placing the New York suspension tower anywhere else would make the bridge look asymmetrical, which he believed was a worse outcome than placing the tower within the park.

The states conducted a study in mid-1925, which found that the Hudson River bridge would be able to pay for itself in twenty-five years if a 50-cent toll were to be placed on every vehicle. After funding was secured, surveyors began examining feasible sites for the future bridge's approaches in August 1925. By law, the New York end of the Hudson River Bridge could only be constructed between 178th and 185th Streets, and the New Jersey end had to be built directly across the river. Geologists made  test bores on the New Jersey side to determine if the site was feasible for laying foundations for the bridge. Othmar Ammann was hired as the bridge's chief engineer. In Ammann's original plans for the bridge, which had been published in March 1925, he had envisioned that the bridge would contain two sidewalks; a roadway that could carry up to 8,000 vehicles per hour; and space for four railroad tracks, in case the two North River railroad tunnels downstream exceeded their train capacity. Cass Gilbert was hired in January 1926 to design architectural elements for the Hudson River bridge, including the suspension towers. The bridge design had yet to be finalized, and its cost could not even be estimated at that point due to the complexity of factors.

Gilbert released preliminary sketches of the Hudson River bridge that March; by then, the architect had decided that the span would be a suspension bridge. The sketch accompanied a feasibility report that Ammann and other engineers presented to the Port of New York Authority, which was to operate the bridge. The bridge would initially carry four lanes of vehicular traffic and sidewalk lanes; the plans called for three additional phases of expansion, culminating in an eight-lane bridge deck with four rapid-transit tracks underneath. There would also be space to build a second deck in the future below the main deck. Ammann's team also found that the most feasible location for the bridge was at 179th Street in Manhattan (as opposed to 181st or 175th Streets). This was both because the 179th Street location was more aesthetically appealing than the other two locations, and because a 179th Street bridge would be cheaper and shorter in length than a bridge at either of the other streets. At this point in the planning process, the Hudson River bridge's estimated cost was $40million or $50million. Because of the proposed bridge's length, engineers also had to test the strength of materials, including suspension cables, that were to be used in the span. Ammann's research department constructed scale models of various designs for the bridge and tested them in wind tunnels.

By late 1926, one engineer predicted that construction on the Hudson River bridge would start the following summer. In December 1926, the final plans for the bridge were approved by the public and by the War Department. The Port Authority planned to sell off $50million worth of bonds to pay for the bridge, and the initial $20million bond issue was sold that December. Further issues arose when the New Jersey Assembly passed a bill in March 1927, which increased the New Jersey governor's power to veto Port Authority contracts. Smith, the New York governor, and Silzer, the now-former New Jersey governor who had been appointed Port Authority chairman, both objected to the bill since the Port Authority had been intended as a bi-state venture. Afterward, the then-current New Jersey governor A. Harry Moore worked with legislators to revise the legislation. The revised law was ultimately not a significant deviation from the Port Authority's practice at the time, wherein the Port Authority was already submitting its contracts to New Jersey government for review.

Construction 
The George Washington Bridge's construction employed three teams of workers: one each for the New Jersey tower, the New York tower, and the deck. The construction process was relatively safe, although twelve or thirteen workers died during its construction. Of these, three were killed when the foundation for the New Jersey tower flooded; a fourth worker was killed by a blast at the New Jersey anchorage; and the others died because of their own carelessness, according to Port Authority records.

First contracts 
In April 1927, the Port Authority opened the first bids for the construction of the Hudson River bridge. It was specifically seeking bids for the construction of the New Jersey suspension tower's foundation. The Manhattan suspension anchorage's location was still undecided at this time. A bid for the New Jersey tower was awarded later that month. In May, the Port Authority opened more bids for the construction of the bridge's approaches and anchorage on the New Jersey side. Dredging operations on the Hudson River, which would allow large ships to pass underneath the bridge, also started that May. By late August, the Port Authority had started condemning plots of land for the bridge's approaches.

Montgomery B. Case, chief construction engineer, began construction on the Hudson River bridge began on September 21, 1927, with groundbreaking ceremonies held at the sites of both future suspension towers. The riverbed around the towers' sites was dredged first, and then steel pilings were placed in the riverbed to create a watertight cofferdam. The cofferdams for the bridge were the largest ever built at the time. In early October of that year, the Port Authority received bids for the construction of the bridge deck. There were two main methods being considered for the span's construction: the cheaper "wire-cable" method and the more expensive "eyebar" method. The wire-cable method, where the vertical suspender wires are attached directly to the main cables and the deck directly, would require a stiffening truss to support the deck. The eyebar method, where the suspender wires are attached to a chain of eyebars (metal bars with holes in them), would be self-supporting. Ultimately, the Port Authority chose the wire-cable design because of costs, and it awarded the contract for constructing the deck to John A. Roebling Sons' Company. The first serious accident during the bridge's construction occurred in December 1927, when three men drowned while working in a caisson on the New Jersey side.

Towers and anchorages 

Bids for the Manhattan suspension tower were advertised in March 1928. At this point, 64% of the total projected worth of construction contracts had been awarded. The piers that provided foundation for the New Jersey suspension tower and approaches were being constructed. The cliffs on both sides of the river were high enough that only minimal bridge approaches were required on either side. In May 1928, builders started drilling a  cut through the Palisades on the New Jersey side so that the Hudson River bridge approach could be built. By June 1928, half of the money earned during the previous year's $20million bond sale had been spent on construction. By that October, nearly all blasting operations had been completed. The suspension towers consisted of 13 segments, each of which were almost 50 feet high.

The New York anchorage required  of concrete, being freestanding, while the New Jersey anchorage was blasted into the Palisades. By March 1929, the concrete structure of the New York anchorage had been completed, three months ahead of schedule. The anchorage on the New Jersey side, which had been fully bored, consisted of two holes that had been bored 250 feet into the face of the Palisades. On the New Jersey side,  of rock had to be blasted out to make way for the New Jersey approach. The suspension towers were nearly complete at the time of the report; only 100 feet of each tower's height remained to be built. Anchors were being placed in the two holes that were being drilled for the New Jersey anchorage, and this task was also nearing completion.

In April, the Port Authority acquired the last of the properties that were in the path of the bridge's Manhattan approach. Plans for the Manhattan approach were approved by the New York City Board of Estimate around the same time. The approach was to consist of scenic, meandering ramps leading to both Riverside Drive and the Henry Hudson Parkway, which run along the eastern bank of the Hudson River at the bottom of the cliff in Washington Heights. The bridge would also connect to 178th and 179th Streets, at the top of Washington Heights. A third connection would be made to an underground highway running between and parallel to 178th and 179th Streets; this connection would become the 178th–179th Street Tunnels, and would later be replaced by the Trans-Manhattan Expressway. The original plan for the approach to the underground highway stated that the approach would be made using a monumental stone viaduct descending from the span at a 2.2% gradient. The Port Authority started evicting residents in the approach's path in October 1929. The same month, the Port Authority sold the final $30million in bonds to pay for the bridge.

The plans for the Hudson River bridge's Fort Lee approach were also changed in January 1930. Originally, the bridge would have terminated in a traffic circle, a type of intersection design that was being built around New Jersey during the 1920s and 1930s. However, the revised plans called for a grade-separated highway approach that would connect to a traffic "distributing basin" with ramps to nearby highways. The total cost of land acquisition for the bridge approaches on both sides of the Hudson River exceeded $10million.

Cable spinning 

After the towers were completed, two temporary catwalks were built between the two suspension towers. Then, workers began laying the bridge's four main cables, a series of thick cables that stretch between the tops of the two towers and carry what would later become the upper deck. The first strand of the first main cable was hoisted between both towers in July 1929, in a ceremony attended by the governors of both states and the mayors of New York City and Fort Lee. The two temporary catwalks allowed workers to spin the wires for the main cables on-site. The wires for the cables were spun by dozens of reels at a dock near the base of the New York anchorage; each reel contained 30 miles of wire at any given time. A total of 105,986 wires were used in the bridge when it was completed.

By February 1930, the bridge was halfway complete; since construction was two months ahead of schedule, the bridge was scheduled to open in early 1932. A team of 350 men was spinning the wires for each of the  main cables, which were 22% complete. In addition, the builders had started ordering steel for the deck. By April, the spinning of the main cables was half complete. The first main cable was completed in late July 1930, and the other three main cables were completed that August, with the laying of the last wire being marked by a ceremony. The spinning of the main cables had taken ten months in total.

After the main cables were laid, workers spun the suspender wires that connected the main cables with the deck. When it was finished, the system of cables would support  of the deck's weight, though the cables would be strong enough to carry , four times as much weight. The construction of a lower deck for rail usage was postponed, since the start of the Depression meant that there would not be enough railroad traffic to justify the construction of such a deck in the near future.

Nearing completion 

An agreement between the Port of New York Authority and the City of New York, dated July 29, 1930, was formed to convey property and property easements granted in relation to the New York Approach to the then Hudson River Bridge. That month, the Port Authority opened the bidding process for contracts to build the Hudson River bridge's approaches on the New York side. These included contracts for the 178th-179th Street Tunnels and the Riverside Drive connection. The tunnel contracts were awarded later that month. In August, the bidding process for the Fort Lee approaches was opened. Bids for the Riverside Drive connection were received the following month.

Prior to and during construction, the bridge was unofficially known as the "Hudson River Bridge" or "Fort Lee Bridge". The Hudson River Bridge Association started seeking suggestions for the bridge's official name in October 1930. Residents of New York and New Jersey were encouraged to send naming choices to the association, which would then forward the suggestions to the Port Authority. According to ballot voting submitted to the Port Authority, the "Hudson River Bridge" name was the most popular choice. The Port Authority preferred the name "George Washington Memorial Bridge", which had been proposed by a board member, and still others championed the name "Palisades Bridge". However, the Port Authority formally adopted the "George Washington" name on January 13, 1931, honoring the general and future president's evacuation of Manhattan at the bridge's location during the Revolutionary War. This was described as potentially confusing, since there was already a "Washington Bridge" connecting 181st Street with the Bronx, directly across Manhattan from the "George Washington Bridge" across the Hudson River. Shortly afterward, the Port Authority Board of Commissioners voted to reconsider the renaming of the Hudson River Bridge, stating that it was open to alternate names. Hundreds of naming choices had been submitted by this time. The most popular naming choices were those of Washington, Christopher Columbus, and Hudson River namesake Henry Hudson. The span was again officially named for George Washington in April 1931. This decision was applauded by then-congressman Fiorello La Guardia, who felt that other options "insulted the memory of our first President and encouraged the Reds".

The system of girders to support the deck were installed throughout 1930, and the last girder was installed in late December 1930. In March 1931, the Port Authority announced that the Hudson River Bridge was set to open later that year, rather than in 1932 as originally planned. At that time, the Port Authority had opened bids for paving the road surface. Later that month, the agency published a report, which stated that the bridge's early opening date was attributable to how quickly and efficiently the various materials had been transported. In June 1931, forty bankers became the first people to cross the bridge.

Work was progressing quickly on the bridge approaches in New Jersey, and the New York City government was considering building another bridge between Manhattan and the Bronx (the Alexander Hamilton Bridge) to connect with the George Washington Bridge. Bids for constructing tollbooths and floodlight towers were opened in July 1931.

Opening and early years

Opening 

The George Washington Bridge was dedicated on October 24, 1931, and the bridge opened to traffic on October 25, 1931, eight months ahead of schedule. The opening ceremony, attended by 30,000 guests, was accompanied by a show from military airplanes, as well as speeches from politicians including New Jersey governor Morgan Foster Larson and New York governor Franklin D. Roosevelt. The first people to cross the George Washington Bridge were reportedly two elementary school students who roller-skated across the bridge from the New York side. Pedestrians were allowed to walk the length of the George Washington Bridge between 6 p.m. and 11 p.m. The bridge was formally opened to traffic the next day. The Port Authority collected tolls for drivers who used the bridge in either direction; as with the Holland Tunnel, the toll was set at 50 cents for passenger cars, with different toll rates for other vehicle types. Pedestrians paid a toll of 10 cents each, which was lowered to 5 cents in 1934. Within the first 24 hours of the George Washington Bridge's official opening, 56,312 cars used the span, as well as 100,000 pedestrians (including those who had walked across after the ceremony). The Port Authority reported that 33,540 pedestrians crossed the bridge on the first day, of which 20,000 paid a toll to cross.

During the George Washington Bridge's construction, the cost of the bridge was estimated at $75million, and the bridge was expected to carry eight million vehicles and 1.5million pedestrians in its first year of operation. When the George Washington Bridge opened, it was estimated that eight million vehicles would use the bridge in its first year, and that the bridge could ultimately carry 60million vehicles annually after a second deck was added. The bridge's final cost was estimated at $60million. Real-estate speculators believed that the bridge's construction would raise real-estate values in Fort Lee, since the borough's residents would be able to more easily access New York City. During the construction of the George Washington Bridge, speculators spent millions of dollars to buy land around the bridge's New Jersey approach. The bridge was later credited with helping raise land prices and encouraging residential development in formerly agricultural parts of Bergen County. It also spurred the rise of the trucking industry along the United States' East Coast, supplanting much of the freight railroads that used to carry cargo.

In the George Washington Bridge's first week of operation, the bridge carried 116,265 vehicles, compared to the Holland Tunnel's 173,010 vehicles, despite the fact that the tunnel had fewer lanes than the bridge did. During that time span, 56,000 pedestrians used the bridge. A week after the bridge opened, the 10-lane tollbooth was expanded to 14 lanes because of heavy weekend traffic volumes. In its first year of operation, the George Washington Bridge saw 5.5million vehicular crossings and nearly 500,000 pedestrian crossings. Traffic counts on the George Washington Bridge grew year after year. By the time of the bridge's tenth anniversary in 1941, the span had been used by 72million vehicles total, including a record 9.1million vehicles in 1940.

Early modifications 

New Jersey Route 4, which connected directly to the bridge's western end, opened in July 1932. The 178th-179th Street Tunnels, which connected Amsterdam Avenue on the eastern side of Manhattan to the bridge's eastern end on the west side of Manhattan, were supposed to be completed in late 1932. Direct approaches to Riverside Drive and the Hudson River Parkway were completed in 1937, and the tunnels were completed in 1938–1939. A ramp eastward from the bridge and southward to the Harlem River Drive was also completed around this time. On the New Jersey side, state highways were also being modernized to handle bridge traffic. The bridge's westbound entrance ramp from Fort Washington Avenue, at the top of the cliff on the Manhattan side, opened in April 1939. The corresponding eastbound exit ramp, as well as the 178th Street Tunnel, opened in June 1940. The 179th Street tunnel opened in 1950.

Originally, the George Washington Bridge's single deck consisted of six lanes, with an unpaved center median. In 1946, the median was paved over and two more lanes were created on the upper level, widening it from six lanes to eight lanes. The two center lanes on the upper level served as reversible lanes, which could handle traffic in either direction, depending on traffic flows.

The bridge was initially lit by 200 lights to provide warning to pilots flying at night. The Port Authority enacted a photography ban during World War II in the 1940s. Additionally, from May 1942 to May 1945, the lights on the bridge were shut off at night as a precautionary measure. After the war ended, the lights were turned back on, but the photography ban was upheld.

Lower deck 
The completion of the George Washington Bridge's lower deck, as well as the construction of a new bus terminal and other highway connections near the bridge, were recommended in a 1955 study that suggested improvements to the New York City area's highway system. The lower deck was approved by the U.S. Army Corps of Engineers. A Bergen County leader voted against the construction of the lower level in 1956, temporarily delaying construction plans. The New York City Planning Commission approved the George Washington Bridge improvement in June 1957, and the Port Authority allocated funds to the improvement that July. The $183million project included the construction of the lower deck; the George Washington Bridge Expressway, a 12-lane expressway connecting to the Alexander Hamilton Bridge and the Cross Bronx Expressway (later I-95 and US 9); the George Washington Bridge Bus Station above the expressway; and a series of new ramps to and from the Henry Hudson Parkway. On the New Jersey side, two depressed toll plazas, one in each direction, were to be constructed for lower level traffic. Highway connections were also being built on the New Jersey side, including a direct approach from I-95.

Construction of the approaches started in September 1958. Work on the lower level itself started on June 2, 1959, but work was briefly halted later that year because of a lack of steel. By February 1960, construction was underway on the lower level; the supporting steelwork for the future deck had been completed, and the sections for the lower deck were being installed. The construction of the slabs proceeded from either side of the bridge. The right-of-way for the George Washington Bridge Expressway had been almost entirely cleared except for the ventilation buildings for the 178th-179th Street Tunnels. The segments of the lower deck had been laid completely by September 1960, at which point workers started pouring the concrete for the deck's roadway, a process that took five weeks. Finally, the deck was paved over with a  layer of asphalt.

New ramps to the George Washington Bridge in New Jersey, including from the newly completed I-95, opened in mid-1962. The lower deck was opened to the public on August 29, 1962. The lower level, nicknamed "Martha" after George's wife Martha Washington, increased the capacity of the bridge by 75 percent, and simultaneously made the George Washington Bridge the world's only 14-lane suspension bridge. The George Washington Bridge Bus Station opened on January 17, 1963 and the Alexander Hamilton Bridge opened on January 15, 1963, thus allowing more traffic to use the George Washington Bridge. In the first year after the lower level's opening, the expanded bridge had carried 44million vehicles. By comparison, 35.86million vehicles had crossed the bridge in an 11-month period between September 1, 1961 and July 31, 1962. In addition, traffic congestion at the George Washington Bridge was reduced after the lower level opened, and the Port Authority was able to make repairs to the upper level for the first time in the bridge's history.

Later history

Late 20th century 
A fixed median was added to the upper deck in the 1970s. The bridge was carrying 82.8million vehicles per year by 1980. The George Washington Bridge was designated a National Historic Civil Engineering Landmark by the American Society of Civil Engineers on October 24, 1981, the 50th anniversary of the bridge's dedication ceremony. The 50th anniversary was also marked with a parade of automobiles. At that point, 1.8billion vehicles had used the bridge throughout its lifetime.

In 1990, the Port Authority announced a minor rehabilitation for the George Washington Bridge. As part of the project, the supporting structural steel for the upper deck would be replaced, and some ramps would be rebuilt. The ramps on the New York side, connecting with Riverside Drive and the Henry Hudson Parkway, were to be reconstructed for $27.6million after studies in the late 1980s showed deterioration on these ramps. Although the Port Authority had announced the repairs in advance, the start of roadwork in September 1990 caused extensive traffic jams.

Early 21st century 

Starting on July 4, 2000, and for subsequent special occasions, each of the George Washington Bridge's suspension towers has been illuminated by 380 light fixtures that highlight the exposed steel structure. On each tower there are a mix of 150 and 1000 watt metal halide lamp fixtures. The architectural lighting design was completed by Domingo Gonzalez Associates.

In 2000, the Port Authority proposed building a ramp from the lower level to the Palisades Interstate Parkway on the New Jersey side. Originally, the ramp would have cost $86.5million and would have been completed in 2003 or 2004. However, the connection was ultimately not built.

In December 2011, the Port Authority announced plans to repair the bridge. For the first time, the vertical suspender ropes would be replaced, at an expected cost of more than $1billion paid for by toll revenue. On August 5, 2013, repair crews began an $82-million effort to fix cracks in upper-deck structural steel caused by traffic, particularly heavy trucks. The plan called for replacing 632 road deck panels, which would add at least 20 years of service life to the roadway. The work proceeded at night, and was slated to be complete by year's end. However, delays prevented completion and ultimately the work was halted for the winter. Work restarted in June 2014, and was expected to last another 12 weeks.

The Port Authority also started work on some other projects to renovate or replace bridge components. The lower level was repaved in 2016, and repainting work and maintenance platform replacement on the lower deck was completed in 2017. The bridge's 592 suspender ropes, which run vertically between the main suspension cables and the deck, were to be replaced between 2017 and 2023 to fix damage caused by excessive heat and humidity. The staircases leading to the sidewalks on both the northern and southern sides of the upper deck were also being replaced with ramps that were compliant with the Americans with Disabilities Act of 1990. The Trans-Manhattan Expressway was being renovated in conjunction with this project. On the New Jersey side, the Palisades Interstate Parkway cloverleaf ramp onto the eastbound George Washington Bridge would be replaced at a cost of $112.6million by 2019. Two overpasses near the bridge would also be refurbished by 2022.

Road connections

New Jersey 
The George Washington Bridge carries I-95 and US 1/9 between New Jersey and New York. Coming from New Jersey, US 46 terminates at the state border in the middle of the bridge. Further west, I-80, US 9W, New Jersey Route 4, and the New Jersey Turnpike also feed into the bridge via either I-95, U.S. 1/9, or U.S. 46 but end before reaching it. I-80 also gives drivers from the Garden State Parkway and Route 17 access to the bridge, and access from it as seen by signage on I-95 south. The Palisades Interstate Parkway connects directly to the bridge's upper level, though not to the lower level; however, a ramp to link the Interstate Parkway to the lower level was proposed in 2000. The marginal roads and local streets above the highways are known as GWB Plaza. The bridge's toll plaza, which collects tolls from eastbound traffic only, is located on the New Jersey side.

New York 

On the New York side, the 12-lane Trans-Manhattan Expressway heads east across the narrow neck of Upper Manhattan, from the bridge to the Harlem River. It provides access from both decks to 178th and 179th Streets, which cross Manhattan horizontally; the Henry Hudson Parkway and Riverside Drive, on the Hudson River's eastern bank along the west side of Manhattan; and to Amsterdam Avenue and the Harlem River Drive, on the Harlem River's western bank on the east side. The expressway connects directly with the Alexander Hamilton Bridge, which spans the Harlem River as part of the Cross-Bronx Expressway (I-95), providing access to the Major Deegan Expressway (I-87). Heading towards New Jersey, local access to the bridge is available from 179th Street. There are also ramps connecting the bridge to the George Washington Bridge Bus Terminal, a commuter bus terminal with direct access to the New York City Subway at the 175th Street station on the IND Eighth Avenue Line (served by the ).

Originally, the approach to the George Washington Bridge from the New York side consisted of a roundabout encircling a fountain, which was designed by Cass Gilbert. This plan was scrapped after it was deemed to be infeasible, due to the congestion that the weaving movements would create. The final plans called for meandering roadways from Riverside Drive and Henry Hudson Parkway, which run along the eastern bank of the Hudson River at the bottom of the cliff in Washington Heights. The Henry Hudson Parkway actually passes under the New York side's anchorage using an underpass designed by Gilbert. The connection to the 178th–179th Street Tunnels, which connected to the southbound Harlem River Drive, opened in 1940. The tunnels were replaced by the Trans-Manhattan Expressway, which opened in 1962. The tunnels and expressway were built to minimize disruption to the Washington Heights neighborhood, which had already been developed at the time.

Alternate routes 

Further south along the Hudson River, the Lincoln Tunnel (Route 495) and Holland Tunnel (Interstate 78/Route 139) also enter Manhattan. Both tunnels are operated by the Port Authority, which collects tolls from drivers crossing the Hudson River eastbound toward New York City. The Verrazzano-Narrows Bridge (I-278), connecting the New York City boroughs of Staten Island and Brooklyn, is the southernmost alternate route. It connects to the Bayonne Bridge, Goethals Bridge, and Outerbridge Crossing between Staten Island and New Jersey. All four bridges to Staten Island collect tolls for drivers driving into the island.

Farther north within the New York metropolitan area, the Tappan Zee Bridge (Interstates 87/287 and New York State Thruway) avoids the congested Cross Bronx Expressway and the city proper. Thruway traffic sometimes uses the George Washington Bridge as a detour, since no roads cross the Hudson River between the George Washington and Tappan Zee bridges. The Tappan Zee Bridge also charges tolls for eastbound drivers.

Tolls 

, the tolls-by-mail rate going from New Jersey to New York are $17 for cars and motorcycles; there is no toll for passenger vehicles going from New York to New Jersey. New Jersey and New York–issued E-ZPass users are charged $12.75 for cars and $11.75 for motorcycles during off-peak hours, and $14.75 for cars and $13.75 for motorcycles during peak hours. Users with E-ZPass issued from agencies outside of New Jersey and New York are charged the tolls-by-mail rate.

Tolls are collected at a series of tollbooths on the New Jersey side. The bridge has 29 toll lanes: 12 in the main upper-level toll plaza, 10 in the lower-level toll plaza, and seven in the Palisades Interstate Parkway toll plaza leading to the upper level. The toll plazas on the lower level and Palisades Parkway are not staffed during the overnight hours and accept only E-ZPass transactions during this period.

Originally, tolls were collected in both directions. The original toll booth was designed by Gilbert, who also designed a classical-style maintenance booth, neither of which is extant. In August 1970, the toll was abolished for westbound drivers, and at the same time, eastbound drivers saw their tolls doubled. The tolls of eleven other New York–New Jersey and Hudson River crossings along a  stretch, from the Outerbridge Crossing in the south to the Rip Van Winkle Bridge in the north, were also changed to south- or eastbound-only at that time. E-ZPass was accepted for toll payment on the George Washington Bridge starting in July 1997. Soon afterward, the Port Authority proposed removing the tollbooths for the E-ZPass lanes on the lower level and Palisades Parkway toll plazas, replacing them with electronic toll collection gantries to allow motorists to maintain highway speeds.

Pedestrians and cyclists may cross free of charge on the south sidewalk. Pedestrians traveling in either direction originally paid tolls of 10 cents when the bridge opened. The pedestrian toll was reduced to 5 cents in 1935 and discontinued altogether in 1940.

Open road tolling was implemented for drivers going from Palisades Interstate Parkway on February 2, 2020, on the lower level on November 7, 2020, and on the upper level on July 10, 2022. The tollbooths will be dismantled, and drivers will no longer be able to pay cash at the bridge. Instead, there will be cameras mounted onto new overhead gantries on the New Jersey side going to New York. A vehicle without E-ZPass will have a picture taken of its license plate and a bill for the toll will be mailed to its owner. For E-ZPass users, sensors will detect their transponders wirelessly. In March 2020, due to the COVID-19 pandemic, all-electronic tolling was temporarily placed in effect for all Port Authority crossings, including the George Washington Bridge. Cash toll collection was temporarily reinstated on the upper level only from October 2020 to July 2022 while the required open road tolling infrastructure was being installed. The carpool discount was eliminated when open-road tolling commenced on the upper level in July 2022.

Historic toll rates 

Tolls for the bridge cost $.50 one way in 1931, but have been raised over the years to a $17 cash toll for passenger vehicles, which was enacted on January 8, 2023.

Prior to July 10, 2022, a discounted carpool toll ($7.75) was available at all times for cars with three or more passengers using NY or NJ E-ZPass, who proceed through a staffed toll lane (provided they have registered with the free "Carpool Plan"), except if entering from the Palisades Interstate Parkway entrance to the bridge. The Carpool Plan ended when the George Washington Bridge implemented cashless tolling.

Non-motorized access 

The George Washington Bridge contains two sidewalks that can be used by pedestrians and bicyclists. The southern sidewalk (accessible by a long, steep ramp on the Manhattan side of the bridge) is shared by cyclists and pedestrians. The entrance in Manhattan is at 178th Street, just west of Cabrini Boulevard, and also has access to the Hudson River Greenway north of the bridge. Both sidewalks are accessible on the New Jersey side from Hudson Terrace. The George Washington Bridge carries New York State Bicycle Route 9, a bike route that runs from New York City north to Rouses Point.

The Port Authority closed the northern sidewalk at all times in 2008. Though it offers direct access into Palisades Interstate Park, the northern sidewalk requires stairway climbs and descents on both sides, which was inaccessible for people with physical disabilities and posed a risk in poor weather conditions. Advocacy groups such as Transportation Alternatives also suggested improvements.

As part of the project to replace the bridge's vertical support cables, the connections to both sidewalks will be enhanced or rebuilt and made ADA-compliant. While the south-side cables are being replaced, that sidewalk will be closed and the north sidewalk will be open. Once the entire project is completed in 2023, pedestrians will use the south sidewalk and cyclists will use the north sidewalk. The sidewalk aspect of the project is expected to cost $118million.

Incidents

Suicides and deaths 

The George Washington Bridge is among the most frequently chosen sites in the New York metropolitan area for suicide by jumping or falling off the bridge. The first death by jumping occurred before the bridge even opened, though it was unintentional. On September 21, 1930, a stunt jumper named Norman J. Terry jumped off the bridge's deck in front of a crowd of thousands, but because his body was facing the wrong way, he broke his neck upon hitting the water. The first intentional suicide occurred on November 3, 1931, a little more than one week after the bridge opened.

Several suicide attempts off the George Washington Bridge have been widely publicized. In 1994, a person going by the name "Prince" called The Howard Stern Show while on the bridge, threatening to kill himself, but Howard Stern managed to talk him out of it. The 2010 suicide of Tyler Clementi, who had jumped from the bridge, drew national attention to cyberbullying and the struggles facing LGBT youth.

In 2012, a record 18 people threw themselves off the bridge to their deaths, while 43 others attempted to do so but survived. There were 18 deaths reported in both 2014 and 2015. In 2014, 74 people were stopped by the Port Authority police, while the next year, another 86 people were stopped by the Port Authority police. In 2016, there were 12 reported deaths, a decrease from previous years, while 70 people were stopped by the Port Authority police. In 2017, the Port Authority proposed equipping a two-person Emergency Services Unit team with harnesses to prevent suicides from the bridge. Following 15 reported deaths and 68 attempts in 2017, the Port Authority installed protective netting and an  fence along each upper level sidewalk. The netting partially overhangs the sidewalks in order to prevent potential jumpers from scaling the fence directly. The southern sidewalk was closed from September to December 2017 so that a temporary fence could be installed there. Once the temporary fence had been erected, the permanent 11-foot-high barrier was constructed on the northern sidewalk, followed by the permanent barrier on the southern sidewalk.

Controversies and protests 
From September 9 to 13, 2013, dedicated toll lanes for one of the local Fort Lee entrances to the bridge's upper level were reduced from three to one, with the two other lanes diverted to highway traffic, without notification to local government officials and emergency responders. The closures were made on the direction of aides and appointees of New Jersey Governor Chris Christie, causing a political controversy called "Bridgegate". The local toll lane reductions caused massive traffic congestion, with major delays for school transportation and police and emergency service responses within Fort Lee. The repercussions and controversy surrounding these actions have been investigated by the Port Authority, federal prosecutors, and a New Jersey legislature committee.

On September 12, 2020, a hundred anti-police brutality protesters from the Black Lives Matter movement converged from both New York and New Jersey, closing the upper level of the bridge for about an hour before walking to the New York City Police Department's 34th Precinct in Manhattan.

Other incidents 

On December 28, 1966, a 19-year-old pilot made an emergency landing on the bridge's New Jersey side after his plane's engine failed. There were no deaths reported, because there was very little traffic at the time, but the pilot and his passenger were injured. At the time, there was no median barrier on the bridge's upper deck.

In June 1977, two tractor-trailers nearly fell off the lower level after jackknifing, then going through both the roadway barrier and a mesh net next to the roadway. One of the drivers was hurt slightly, while the other driver was not hurt. The accident also involved a third tractor-trailer and two passenger cars, none of whose occupants were hurt. Accidents involving trucks dumping their cargo have also occurred on the George Washington Bridge. Watermelons, frozen chicken parts, and horse manure have all fallen onto the bridge's roadway at some point.

The first-ever complete closure of the George Washington Bridge occurred on August 6, 1980, when a truck carrying highly flammable propane gas across the bridge started to leak. As a safety precaution in case the fuel started to ignite, traffic across the bridge was halted for several hours, and 2,000 people living near the bridge were evacuated. Two police officers eventually plugged the leak with an inexpensive device. Up to that point, trucks carrying flammable material had been allowed to use the George Washington Bridge. After the incident, New York City officials conducted a study on whether to prohibit hazardous cargo from traveling through the city.

In popular culture 
The bridge is seen in a number of movies set in New York: 
 Ball of Fire (1941) was the first film to show the bridge.  
 In Force of Evil (1948), Leo Morse is buried under the bridge by the mob of gangsters employing his brother Joe. 
 In How to Marry a Millionaire (1953), Loco and Brewster are fêted as being in the 50 millionth car to cross the bridge as part of the "George Washington Bridge Week" festivities.
 In Network (1976), Schumacher tells a funny story in which, having overslept for a news shoot about the bridge's new lower deck,  gets into a cab wearing a raincoat over his pajamas and tells the driver to take him to the middle of the bridge. The taxi driver, concerned that Schumacher intends to jump, begs him: "Don't do it buddy! You're a young man!"  
 Sully (2016) reenacts how Sullenberger overflew the bridge by a few hundred feet. 
 The bridge was also shown in The Godfather (1972), and Cop Land (1997).

The bridge has been featured in music. In the opening singalong for Sesame Street, Ernie sang the words "George Washington Bridge" to the tune of Sobre las Olas ("The Loveliest Night of the Year"). In addition, William Schuman's 1950 work George Washington Bridge. Nina Rosario sings "Just me and the GWB asking, 'Gee, Nina, what'll you be?" in "Breathe" from In the Heights.

In visual art, the first issue of the comic Atomic War! published in November 1952, the George Washington Bridge is shown collapsing during a bombing of New York City. Additionally, painters George Ault and Valeri Larko have both created artworks named after the bridge. Video games such as Metal Gear Solid 2: Sons of Liberty also showed the George Washington Bridge.

The bridge is also represented on the story quilt Woman on a Bridge #1 of 5: Tar Beach, 1988 (permanent collection of the Solomon R. Guggenheim Museum in New York City), by Afro-American visual artist Faith Ringgold. Based on it, she later published her first children book, Tar Beach, 1991, where the GWB is always present in the landscape. It is the story of Cassie, a young girl dreaming to fly above her Harlem home. Her own father had been a worker to build the bridge, opened on the very day she was born. She finds it as beautiful as a diamond necklace. This book has received over 20 awards including  the Ezra Jack Keats New Writer Award and the Coretta Scott King Award for Illustration.

The construction of the bridge is detailed in George Washington Bridge: A Timeless Marvel and George Washington Bridge: Poetry in Steel. The bridge and the nearby Little Red Lighthouse are the subjects of Hildegarde Swift's 1942 children's book The Little Red Lighthouse and the Great Gray Bridge.

See also 

 List of bridges documented by the Historic American Engineering Record in New Jersey
 List of bridges documented by the Historic American Engineering Record in New York
 List of fixed crossings of the Hudson River

References

Notes

Citations

Sources

External links 

 George Washington Bridge Official Site by the Port Authority of New York and New Jersey
George Washington Bridge at Bridges & Tunnels
George Washington Bridge at NYCRoads.com

 The George Washington Bridge in Heavy Smog, View Toward the New Jersey Side of the Hudson River from World Digital Library

1931 establishments in New Jersey
1931 establishments in New York (state)
1931 establishments in New York City
Bike paths in New Jersey
Bike paths in New York City
Bridge light displays
Bridges by Othmar Ammann
Bridges completed in 1931
Bridges in Bergen County, New Jersey
Washington
Bridges of the United States Numbered Highway System
Bridges on the Interstate Highway System
Bridges over the Hudson River
Cass Gilbert buildings
Double-decker bridges
Fort Lee, New Jersey
Historic American Engineering Record in New Jersey
Historic American Engineering Record in New York City
Historic Civil Engineering Landmarks
Interstate 95
Interstate vehicle bridges in the United States
Pedestrian bridges in New York City
Port Authority of New York and New Jersey
Road bridges in New Jersey
Road bridges in New York City
Steel bridges in the United States
Suspension bridges in New Jersey
Suspension bridges in New York City
Toll bridges in New Jersey
Toll bridges in New York City
Tolled sections of Interstate Highways
U.S. Route 1
U.S. Route 46
U.S. Route 9
Washington Heights, Manhattan